Orchipedum is a genus of trematodes in the family Orchipedidae.

References 

 Orchipedidae at animaldiversity.ummz.umich.edu

Echinostomata
Trematode genera